Alexander James Woodyard (born 3 May 1993) is a professional footballer who plays as a midfielder for AFC Wimbledon.

Career
Woodyard started his career in the youth system of Charlton Athletic, but moved to Southend United as a sixteen-year-old in 2010, starting a two-year scholarship. He made his professional debut in December 2010, starting in their 3–1 away loss to Burton Albion in League Two. He had already made three appearances at the age of seventeen and was one of only two players to receive a professional contract from his age group in the summer of 2011. In August 2011, he was sent out on loan to Conference South side Farnborough for an initial month along with George Smith to gain some first team experience. His loan was later extended until the end of November, with Woodyard making thirteen appearances for the club scoring once in a 4–3 win over Basingstoke Town.

Woodyard made his first Southend appearance in eighteen months in October 2012, a 3–1 win over Dagenham & Redbridge in the Football League Trophy. He impressed on his return to Southend, winning the Shrimpers Player of the Month award in October and November 2012. In March 2013, he joined Conference Premier side Braintree Town on a one-month loan. He made a total of twelve appearances as Braintree finished in the top-half of the table. Upon his return to Southend in May 2013, he was told that his contract would not be renewed as he was deemed surplus to requirements by new manager Phil Brown. Woodyard spent a total of four years with the club, making fifteen first team appearances.

In August 2013, he signed for Conference Premier side Dartford after impressing in pre-season friendlies. He had a turbulent start to his Dartford career, taking abuse from the fans despite solid performances on the right wing. In February 2014, he endeared himself to the fans after an impressive performance against Aldershot Town. In May 2014, after making 43 appearances and following Dartford's relegation to the Conference South, he was invited back for pre-season.

In June 2014, he turned down the opportunity to stay on at Dartford and signed for Conference South side Concord Rangers. After a successful stay at Concord Rangers, where he made 36 appearances and scored one goal, Woodyard joined National League side Braintree Town.

In June 2016, Woodyard signed for Lincoln City, following his Braintree manager Danny Cowley to Sincil Bank. He ended the 2016–17 season as Lincoln's player of the season as they won promotion back to the football league, before signing a new two-year deal on 6 July 2017. On 30 May 2018, he joined Peterborough United for an undisclosed fee after the release clause in his contract was met.

On 3 January 2020 it was announced that Woodyard would join Tranmere Rovers on loan for the remainder of the season.

On 12 June 2020, Woodyard got released by Peterborough United after a 2-year stint at the club. Within those two years he managed 54 appearances for the club and was also captain in the 2018/19 season.

In August 2020 he signed for AFC Wimbledon. He scored his first goal for the club on 20 April 2021 in a 2–1 win against Oxford United.

Career statistics

Honours
Lincoln City
National League: 2016–17
EFL Trophy: 2017–18

References

External links
Southend United profile

Living people
1993 births
Sportspeople from Gravesend, Kent
English footballers
Association football midfielders
Southend United F.C. players
Farnborough F.C. players
Braintree Town F.C. players
Dartford F.C. players
Concord Rangers F.C. players
Lincoln City F.C. players
Peterborough United F.C. players
AFC Wimbledon players
English Football League players
National League (English football) players
England semi-pro international footballers
Tranmere Rovers F.C. players